No More may refer to:

 No More (band), a German post-punk band

Songs 
 "No More" (1944 song), written by Bob Russell and Toots Camarata; covered by Billie Holiday
 "No More" (1961 song), a version of "La Paloma" recorded by Elvis Presley and Dean Martin
 "No More" (A1 song), 2000
 "No More" (Cassie Davis song), 2009
 "No More" (Jamelia song), 2007
 "No More" (Neil Young song), 1989
 "No More" (Ruff Endz song), 2000
 "No More (Baby I'ma Do Right)", by 3LW, 2001
 "No More (I Can't Stand It)", by Maxx, 1994
 "(My Baby Don't Love Me) No More", by the De John Sisters, 1954; covered by the McGuire Sisters, 1954
 "No More", by Badfinger from Say No More, 1981
 "No More", by Carys from To Anyone Like Me, 2020
 "No More", by CNBLUE from Code Name Blue, 2012
 "No More", by DC Talk from Nu Thang, 1990
 "No More", by Disturbed from Evolution, 2018
 "No More", by DJ Snake from Carte Blanche, 2019
 "No More", by Drowning Pool from Full Circle, 2007
 "No More", by Eddie Vedder from the Into the Wild film soundtrack, 2007
 "No More", by f(x) from Pink Tape, 2013
 "No More", by Junoon from Junoon for Peace, 2001
 "No More", by Lil Yachty from Teenage Emotions, 2017
 "No More", by LL Cool J, 2011
 "No More", by Metro Boomin from Not All Heroes Wear Capes, 2018
 "No More", by Nivea from Complicated, 2005
 "No More", by PrettyMuch, 2017
 "No More", by Rock Goddess from Hell Hath No Fury, 1983
 "No More", by Youth of Today from We're Not in This Alone, 1988
 "No More (This Is the Last Time)", by Depeche Mode from Spirit, 2017
 "No More", by Carys from To Anyone Like Me, 2020
 "No More", by Three Days Grace from Life Starts Now, 2009

See also 
 "No More, No More", a song by Aerosmith from Toys in the Attic
 "No More, My Lord", a prison song collected by Alan Lomax in 1948, covered by Cowboy Junkies, Pentangle, and others
 Nothing More, an American rock band
 No más (disambiguation)